Grand Valley (formerly The Township of East Luther Grand Valley) is a town in the Canadian province of Ontario. It comprises the former Township of East Luther and the former Village of Grand Valley. The town is located within Dufferin County, and includes part of the Luther Marsh. The marsh covers over 10,000 acres (40 km²) including Luther Lake. The Grand River is one of the major sites in the town.

Geography
 The town's northern limit is Highway 10 and Highway 89; north of the limit is the township of Melancthon.
 The town's southern limit is Dufferin County Road 109; south of the limit is the township of East Garafraxa.
 The town's eastern limit is Amaranth-East Luther Townline; east of the limit is the township of Amaranth.
 The town's western limit is East Luther-West Luther Line; west of the limit is the township of Wellington North.

Communities
The Town of Grand Valley comprises a number of villages and hamlets, including the following communities such as Colbeck, Damascus, Grand Valley, Leggatt, Monticello, Peepabun, Tarbert; Erasmus, Hill Settlement, Keldon, Wesley; Chatter's Corners, Doyle's Settlement

History
The formation of the town under the name Township of East Luther Grand Valley was a result of an amalgamation effective January 1, 1995, of the Township of East Luther and the Village of Grand Valley. In September 2012, the name was changed to the Town of Grand Valley. Grand Valley was damaged by an F4 tornado on May 31, 1985, that destroyed much of the town's infrastructure, which has since been rebuilt.

Local government

Municipal Office
The Municipal Office for the Town of Grand Valley is located at: 
5 Main Street North
Grand Valley, ON
L9W 5S6

Council
 Mayor: Steve Soloman
 Deputy Mayor: Philip Rentsch
 Councillors:
 Paul Latam
 Lorne Dart
 James Jonker

Grand Valley B.I.A.
The Grand Valley B.I.A. is encouraging commerce developments in the town.  In an attempt to accommodate new development, the town is in the process of updating the By-laws.

The Grand Valley B.I.A., is the smallest BIA in Ontario.

Demographics 

Movies filmed in Grand Valley
The Prize Winner of Defiance, Ohio  (2007) 
Aftermath: Population Zero  (2008) Aftermath: Population Zero  Small segment from 9:00 to 9:12 in the film

See also
 List of towns in Ontario

References

External links

Towns in Ontario
Lower-tier municipalities in Ontario
Municipalities in Dufferin County
Populated places on the Grand River (Ontario)